De Grey is a locality in the Pilbara region of Western Australia, around 75 km east of Port Hedland. Also within the locality is the De Grey homestead, and the De Grey River.

Pilbara